Utgard Peak is a prominent peak, 2,050 m, located 0.8 nautical miles (1.5 km) north-northeast of Wolak Peak in the Asgard Range, Victoria Land. Named by the New Zealand Antarctic Place-Names Committee (NZ-APC) in 1982 from a proposal by G.G.C. Claridge, soil scientist with the DSIR, New Zealand. One of a group of names from Norse mythology in Asgard Range and Jotunheim Valley. Named after Utgard, a fortress in Jotunheim, home of the giants.

Mountains of the Asgard Range
McMurdo Dry Valleys